Tammistu is a village in Tartu Parish, Tartu County in Estonia.

Tammistu manor
Tammistu estate was separated from nearby Kavastu estate in the early 18th century, and has belonged to several different local aristocratic families until 1919, when the government of newly independent Estonia carried out a land reform which rid the aristocracy of basically all its land. The present building dates from the second half of the 19th century.

Gallery

References

Tartu Parish
Villages in Tartu County